Intelsat 8 (formerly PAS-8) is a communications satellite owned by Intelsat located at 166° East of longitude, serving the Pacific Ocean market.

Mission 

INTELSAT 8 (PAS-8) was launched on 4 November 1998 by a Proton Block DM vehicle from Baikonur Cosmodrome. The satellite was designed with 24 Ku-band channels at 100 Watts and 24 C-band channels at 50 Watts. The spacecraft is based on the Space Systems Loral SSL=1300 bus and was part of a series of three satellites ordered from Loral. The satellite was designed for the Pacific market serving Australia, Hawaii, the northwest coast of the U.S., and portions of the Far East.

On 13 August 2012, it was replaced with Intelsat 19. During September 2012, it was co-located to the same position as Intelsat 5 at 169° East from 166° East to continue its service life as Intelsat 5's replacement later in the year.

On 19 October 2012 at around 23:00 UTC, Intelsat 8 took over broadcasting Intelsat 5's television channels which include Australia Network and regular feeds of Entertainment Tonight and The Wall Street Journal Report available via a two-meter dish at 4.1 GHz horizontal.

Decommissioning 
The satellite was moved to a graveyard orbit by 26 December 2016.

References 

Communications satellites in geostationary orbit
Satellite television
Spacecraft launched in 1998
Intelsat satellites
Satellites using the SSL 1300 bus